The Wadi el-Hudi is a wadi in Southern Egypt, in the Eastern Desert. Here were ancient quarries for amethyst. The Wadi el-Hudi is important in archaeology for its high number of rock inscriptions and stelae, mainly dating to the Middle Kingdom, as amethyst was especially popular in this period. The Wadi el-Hudi ends in the Nile valley a few kilometers north of Aswan and is coming there from the South-East. The ancient amethyst quarries are about 20 kilometres south-east from Aswan.

Inscriptions 
The earliest datable inscriptions in the Wadi el-Hudi belong to king Mentuhotep IV who reigned around 2000 BC. in the 11th Dynasty. These are five texts dated to the first year of the king and clearly report the aim of the expedition as bringing amethyst. Further inscriptions date to the 12th Dynasty under king Senusret I. One of them mentions the vizier Intefiqer, another one the high steward Hor. The 12th Dynasty kings Amenemhat II, Senusret III and Amenemhat III are also attested with expeditions and inscriptions. The last 12th Dynasty king sending an expedition to the Wadi was Amenemhat IV. Finally there are several texts providing evidence for an expedition under the 13th Dynasty king Sobekhotep IV. His expedition is dated to the sixth year of his reign.  Hathor, who is called lady of amethyst, appears often in the inscriptions.

In March 2019, the discovery of more than 100 ancient inscriptions carved into rock, 14 stele and 45 ostraca dated back to the Middle Kingdom was announced by archaeologists. In one of the 3,400-year-old stelas was written the name of a senior official named Usersatet.

Archaeology 
In addition to the inscriptions, 39 archaeological sites exist across the region. They are amazingly well preserved, with walls still standing two meters high. These archaeological sites have the key to understanding gem mining, organization of labor by the Egyptian government, use of slaves in Egypt, Egyptian and Nubian interactions, literacy levels within a soldiering class, governmental supply and support of expedition projects, and where much of the amethyst from the ancient Mediterranean World likely originated.

Further mining activities, including gold mining, are known from other periods of Egyptian history, up to the Roman Period, or perhaps just the Early Arab Period.

See also
Arabian-Nubian Shield

References

External links 
Wadi el-Hudi expedition

Archaeological sites in Egypt
Hudi